Maria Febe Kusumastuti (born 30 September 1989) is an Indonesian badminton player from Boyolali, Central Java.

Career 
In 2008, she won women's singles at the Bitburger Open. The next year, she won women's singles at the Australia Open after beating the 1st seeded Yip Pui Yin with a straight set, 21–18, 21–19. Febe played on the 2010 Uber Cup teams for Indonesia which finished at the semifinals after being defeated by China 0–3. She lost to Wang Yihan at the first match. In the 2009 Indonesia Open Superseries, she made a surprise by beating the 5th-seeded Pi Hongyan of France, 24–22, 6–21, 21–15 in the first round, but then lost to Wang Lin at the quarterfinals. She played in 2010 All England Open Superseries and beat Wang Shixian of China, 21–13, 15–21, 21–16, in the first round. Unfortunately, she lost to Jiang Yanjiao of China in straight sets. In 2010, she reached the semifinals at Indonesia Grand Prix Gold but was beaten by Ratchanok Intanon in three sets 17–21, 21–16, 17–21; Intanon later became the world champion in 2013.

Personal life 
Kusumastuti married a former national badminton player from PB Djarum, Andrei Adistia on 27 October 2017.

Achievements

BWF Grand Prix (2 titles, 1 runner-up) 
The BWF Grand Prix had two levels, the Grand Prix and Grand Prix Gold. It was a series of badminton tournaments sanctioned by the Badminton World Federation (BWF) and played between 2007 and 2017.

Women's singles

  BWF Grand Prix Gold tournament
  BWF Grand Prix tournament

BWF International Challenge/Series (1 title, 1 runner-up)  
Women's singles

  BWF International Challenge tournament
  BWF International Series tournament

BWF Junior International (1 title, 1 runner-up) 
Girls' singles

  BWF Junior International Grand Prix tournament
  BWF Junior International Challenge tournament
  BWF Junior International Series tournament
  BWF Junior Future Series tournament

Performance timeline

National team 
 Junior level

 Senior level

Individual competitions 
 Senior level

References

External links 

1989 births
Living people
People from Boyolali Regency
Sportspeople from Central Java
Indonesian female badminton players
Badminton players at the 2010 Asian Games
Asian Games bronze medalists for Indonesia
Asian Games medalists in badminton
Medalists at the 2010 Asian Games
Competitors at the 2011 Southeast Asian Games
Southeast Asian Games silver medalists for Indonesia
Southeast Asian Games medalists in badminton
Badminton coaches
20th-century Indonesian women
21st-century Indonesian women